Liza Ferschtman (born 1979) is a Dutch classical violinist who appears internationally, both as a soloist with orchestra and in chamber music. She received the Nederlandse Muziekprijs in 2006 and has directed the  since 2007.

Education 
Ferschtman was born in Hilversum in a musical family of Russian Jews, the daughter of the cellist  and the pianist . At the age of five she began studying with the violinist Philippe Hirschhorn, a friend of the family, and thereafter with Ivry Gitlis, Igor Oistrach and Aaron Rosand. She studied later at the Royal Conservatory of The Hague with Qui van Woerdekom, at the Conservatorium van Amsterdam with Herman Krebbers, at the Curtis Institute of Music with Ida Kavafian, and at the Guildhall School of Music and Drama with David Takeno.

Solo performances 
Ferschtman has appeared as a soloist with the Concertgebouw Orchestra, the Rotterdam Philharmonic Orchestra, Orchestre National de Belgique, Yomiuri Nippon Symphony Orchestra, Malaysian Philharmonic Orchestra, the Schleswig-Holstein Festival Orchestra and the Bremer Philharmoniker. She has collaborated with conductors such as Frans Brüggen, Christoph von Dohnányi, Iván Fischer, Neeme Järvi, Shlomo Mintz, Mendi Rodan, Leonard Slatkin and Jaap van Zweden, among others. In 2017, she played Alban Berg's Violin Concerto "To the memory of an angel" with the Nordwestdeutsche Philharmonie, conducted by Dirk Kaftan.

Chamber music 
In 2005 and 2006 Ferschtman performed the complete violin sonatas of Ludwig van Beethoven in the Concertgebouw with pianist Inon Barnatan. The duo also played in Europe, including Austria, Belgium, England, France, Germany, Russia and Switzerland. In 2006 the duo played recitals in New York City. Concerts in the Concertgebouw for the 10th anniversary of the Zondagochtendconcert and an open-air solo concert were broadcast on Dutch television.

She has added vocal music and contemporary music to the program, such as in 2016 Weill's Die sieben Todsünden, a new string octet and a concert of the Tallis Scholars.

In 2014, she performed with members of the Beethoven Orchester Bonn a chamber music concert in the Beethoven House, works for string trio by Schubert, Ernst von Dohnányi and György Kurtág, and the piano quartet in C minor, Op. 60, by Johannes Brahms. With harpsichord player Jonathan Cohen, she performed the entirety of Heinrich Biber's Rosary Sonatas in 2016, to positive acclaim. The different violin tunings required Ferschtman to have seven violins on stage; the performance was deemed a "rare tour de force".

Awards 
In 1994 Ferschtman was awarded first prize at the competition Iordens Viooldagen. In 2003 she was awarded second prize at the International violin competition in Sion. On 24 November 2006, she was awarded the Nederlandse Muziekprijs.

Selected recordings 
Her first recording was in 2004; chamber music with the pianist , including César Franck's Violin Sonata, Poulenc's Violin Sonata, Debussy's Violin Sonata, and music by Stravinsky, Tchaikovsky and Shostakovitch. Ferschtman recorded in 2007 Beethoven's Violin Sonata in G major, Op. 96 (1812) and Schubert's Fantasia for piano and violin in C major "Sei mir gegrüßt", D 934, with the pianist Inon Barnatan. A reviewer wrote: "Their playing has that rare combination of freshness and unanimity, as though two like-minded friends are conversing about something dear to their hearts." In 2009, she recorded violin concertos by Julius Röntgen with the Staatsphilharmonie Rheinland-Pfalz, conducted by David Porcelijn. Her tone was described as "nimble but never narrow", and her playing as "infusing every phrase with life and energy". A reviewer noted that, on top of her "purity of tone and absolute singing quality" there is also "a sense of collaboration and amicable teamwork" based on her work as a chamber musician.

References

External links 

 
 Delft Chamber Music Festival
 Nederlandse Muziekprijs fondspodiumkunsten.nl
 Duncan Druce: Liza Ferschtman; Tamsin Waley-Cohen Recitals Gramophone 2015
 Cara Lieurance: A Conversation with KSO Guest Soloist Liza Ferschtman WMUK 27 October 2016 
 Peter Krause: Porträt Liza Ferschtman / "Man muss aufpassen, nicht nur schön Geige zu spielen" (in German) concerti.de 15 January 2017
 Peter Krause: Porträt Liza Ferschtman / "Wie man ist, so spielt man" (in German) concerti.de 24 October 2012
 Liza Ferschtman brengt vers bloed naar Delft (in Dutch) Volkskrant 6 August 2007

21st-century violinists
Dutch classical violinists
1979 births
Living people
People from Hilversum
Royal Conservatory of The Hague alumni
Conservatorium van Amsterdam alumni
Curtis Institute of Music alumni
Alumni of the Guildhall School of Music and Drama
21st-century classical violinists
Women classical violinists